Events from the year 1512 in art.

Events
 Michelangelo completes his nine Sistine Chapel ceiling paintings of the Creation.

Works

 Hans Baldung – The Trinity and Mystic Pietà
 Fra Bartolomeo – Madonna in Glory with Saints (altarpiece, Besançon Cathedral, 1511–12)
 Albrecht Dürer – The Virgin Mary Appearing to St. John on Patmos (woodcut)
 Leonardo da Vinci – Self-portrait in red chalk (approximate date)
 Michelangelo – Sistine Chapel ceiling, including the Separation of Light from Darkness (completed)
 Raphael
 The Expulsion of Heliodorus from the Temple (fresco in the Raphael Rooms of the Apostolic Palace in the Vatican)
 Portrait of Pope Julius II
 The Triumph of Galatea (fresco in Villa Farnesina in Rome)
 Titian – approximate date
 The Gypsy Madonna
 La Schiavona
 The Three Ages of Man
 Lucas van Leyden – The History of Joseph series of engravings, e.g. Joseph Explains Pharaoh's Dream
 Bernard van Orley – Triptych of the Carpenters and Masons Corporation of Brussels ("Apostle Altar")

Births
date unknown
Lazzaro Calvi, Italian painter who frequently collaborated with his brother (died 1587)
Luis de Morales, Spanish painter known as "El Divino" (died 1586)
Battista del Moro, Italian painter of the Renaissance period active in his native Verona (died 1568)
Prospero Fontana, Italian painter of the late Renaissance,  (died 1597)
 (born 1512/1520): Giorgio Ghisi, Italian coppersmith, painter, and engraver  (died 1582)
 1512/1515: Marcello Venusti, Italian Mannerist painter primarily in Rome (died 1579)

Deaths
April 5 - Lazzaro Bastiani, Italian painter of the Renaissance, active mainly in Venice (born 1449)
date unknown - Giovanni Cristoforo Romano, Italian sculptor and medallist (born 1456)

 
Years of the 16th century in art